An English cricket team, organised and led by Lord Hawke, toured South Africa from December 1895 to March 1896. The team played three matches against the South Africa national cricket team which were retrospectively awarded Test status. There is uncertainty about the status of South African cricket as a whole in the late nineteenth century and so only two of Hawke's matches against provincial teams, those involving Transvaal and Western Province, are rated first-class. Hawke's XI is designated England for the Test series which they won 3–0, winning all three matches by substantial margins. Tim O'Brien captained England in the first Test, although Hawke was playing, and Hawke was captain in the second and third Tests. The South African teams were captained by Ernest Halliwell (first two Tests) and Alfred Richards (third Test). Hawke's team was not a full-strength England team, but it did include four of the best players of the time in Tom Hayward, C. B. Fry, George Lohmann and Sammy Woods.

Test series summary
England won the Test series 3–0.

First Test

Second Test

Third Test

References

External links

1895 in English cricket
1895 in South African cricket
1896 in English cricket
1896 in South African cricket
1895-96
International cricket competitions from 1888–89 to 1918
South African cricket seasons from 1888–89 to 1917–18